Mexican Spitfire's Blessed Event is a 1943 American comedy film directed by Leslie Goodwins and written by Charles E. Roberts and Dane Lussier. It is the sequel to the 1942 film Mexican Spitfire's Elephant. The film stars Lupe Vélez, Leon Errol, Walter Reed, Elisabeth Risdon, Lydia Bilbrook and Hugh Beaumont. The film was released on July 17, 1943, by RKO Pictures.

This was the eighth and final film in the series. It marks the penultimate screen appearance for Lupe Velez, who committed suicide on 14 Dec 1944 after completing one more feature in her native Mexico.

Plot
The story unfolds at a dude ranch. Once again, Dennis is competing with another man, in this case George Sharpe, for a contract with distiller Lord Epping. Due to a misunderstanding, everyone thinks Carmelita has had a baby, when in fact it's her cat that has become a new mother. Epping is willing to sign with Dennis provided he can see the baby, so as always, Carmelita and Uncle Matt have to resort to all sorts of subterfuge—including the inevitable impersonation of Epping by Matt and the resultant confusion for everyone else—in order to set things right.

Cast 
 Lupe Vélez as Carmelita Lindsay
 Leon Errol as Uncle Matt Lindsay / Lord Basil Epping 
 Walter Reed as Dennis Lindsay
 Elisabeth Risdon as Aunt Della Lindsay
 Lydia Bilbrook as Lady Ada Epping
 Hugh Beaumont as George Sharpe
 Aileen Carlyle as Mrs. Pettibone
 Alan Carney as Navaho Room bartender
 Wally Brown as Sagebrush Inn Desk Clerk (uncredited)
 Marietta Canty as Verbena

Note: This film was made before RKO paired Carney and Brown as a comedy team, but they have no scenes together.

References

External links 
 
 
 
 

1943 films
American black-and-white films
RKO Pictures films
Films directed by Leslie Goodwins
1943 comedy films
Films produced by Bert Gilroy
American comedy films
1940s English-language films
1940s American films